Dubhead is a 2004 remix album by Pigface and DJ Linux.

Track listing

2004 remix albums
Pigface albums
Underground, Inc. remix albums